Tabasco is a state in Southeast Mexico that is divided into 17 municipalities. According to the 2020 Mexican Census, it has the 20th largest population with  inhabitants and is the 24th largest by land area spanning .

Municipalities in Tabasco are administratively autonomous of the state according to the 115th article of the 1917 Constitution of Mexico. Every three years, citizens elect a municipal president (Spanish: presidente municipal) by a plurality voting system who heads a concurrently elected municipal council (ayuntamiento) responsible for providing all the public services for their constituents. The municipal council consists of a variable number of trustees and councillors (regidores y síndicos). Municipalities are responsible for public services (such as water and sewerage), street lighting, public safety, traffic, and the maintenance of public parks, gardens and cemeteries. They may also assist the state and federal governments in education, emergency fire and medical services, environmental protection and maintenance of monuments and historical landmarks. Since 1984, they have had the power to collect property taxes and user fees, although more funds are obtained from the state and federal governments than from their own income.

The largest municipality by population is Centro, with 683,607 residents while the smallest is Jonuta with 30,798 residents. Tabasco has kept the same number of municipalities since 1883, one of the few Mexican states without recent changes.

Municipalities

Notes

References

 
Tabasco